Rodrigo Barbosa (born September 30, 1988) is a Brazilian racing driver from São Paulo.

After karting, he began racing in Brazilian Formula Renault 2.0 in 2005 and continued in the series in 2006, finishing 19th in points. In 2007 he competed in amateur SCCA Formula Atlantic in the United States and finished 9th at the SCCA Runoff National Championships at Heartland Park Topeka. In 2009 he competed in the Firestone Indy Lights Series for the ELFF Racing team, which returned to the series for the first time since 1993, using a car acquired from Guthrie Meyer Racing. Barbosa struggled to find speed throughout the 2009 season and was constantly in the back of the field, never qualifying ahead of the last row and only managing a best finish of 10th, at Chicagoland Speedway where he was still the last place car running at the finish.

At the season's end he tested with PDM Racing at Barber Motorsports Park and was able to run four seconds per lap faster with the team than he had with ELFF during the open test at Barber earlier that season. He signed on with PDM to contest the 2010 season. Barbosa completed the season in 12th place, again last amongst full-time competitors, but did score four top-ten finishes, and managed to not qualify last in a number of oval races.

In 2012 he scored two podiums in three races in the Brazilian Endurance Championship.

References

External links
Rodrigo Barbosa driver bio on IndyCar.com

1988 births
Living people
Brazilian racing drivers
Brazilian Formula Renault 2.0 drivers
Indy Lights drivers
Racing drivers from São Paulo

PDM Racing drivers